Lene Louise Bang Jespersen is a Danish diplomat. She is Ambassador to Belgium,

Career 
In 1988, she received a study grant from the European Investment Bank. In 1996, she was 2nd secretary to the Ambassador to the United Kingdom. From 2010 to 2014, she was ambassador to Luxembourg.

References 

Danish women ambassadors
Living people
Year of birth missing (living people)
Ambassadors of Denmark to Belgium
Ambassadors of Denmark to Luxembourg